Gold Beach (Tolowa: yan-shu’-chit, yan-shuu-chit’-dvn) is a city in and the county seat of Curry County, Oregon, United States, on the Oregon Coast. The population was 2,241 at the 2020 census.

History
The community was originally named Ellensburg in the 1850s, but later took the name Gold Beach after a beach near the mouth of the Rogue River where hundreds of placer mines extracted gold. An Ellensburg post office was established in 1853, changed to Ellensburg in 1877, and changed to Gold Beach in 1890.

Mailboats based in Gold Beach have been delivering mail upstream to Agness since 1895, one of only two rural mailboat routes remaining in the U.S.

Although Gold Beach had been a community since the middle of the 19th century, and the county seat since 1859, its current incorporation charter only dates to 1945.

Geography

Gold Beach is bordered to the north by the Rogue River and Barley Beach, also known as Bailey Beach.

Climate
Gold Beach has cool, very wet winters and mild, relatively dry summers. The location is heavily influenced by the moderating waters of the Pacific and the cool offshore currents. As a result, the temperature swings are very narrow for a climate of its latitude. According to the Köppen climate classification system, Gold Beach has a warm-summer Mediterranean climate (Csb).

Measurable precipitation occurs on an average of 132 days. Snow is very rare in Gold Beach, averaging only  annually.

According to the Trewartha climate classification, it has a subtropical climate and is one of the northernmost North American locations to have one.

Demographics

2010 census
As of the census of 2010, there were 2,253 people, 1,070 households, and 614 families residing in the city. The racial makeup of the city was 91.5% White, 0.3% African American, 2.0% Native American, 0.8% Asian, 0.6% from other races, and 4.7% from two or more races. Hispanic or Latino of any race were 4.9% of the population.

There were 1,070 households, of which 19.8% had children under the age of 18 living with them, 43.2% were married couples living together, 10.0% had a female householder with no husband present, 4.2% had a male householder with no wife present, and 42.6% were non-families. 37.8% of all households were made up of individuals, and 16.1% had someone living alone who was 65 years of age or older. The average household size was 2.05 and the average family size was 2.60.

The median age in the city was 50.6 years. 16.5% of residents were under the age of 18; 5.8% were between the ages of 18 and 24; 18.4% were from 25 to 44; 36.5% were from 45 to 64; and 22.7% were 65 years of age or older. The gender makeup of the city was 48.5% male and 51.5% female.

2000 census
As of the census of 2000, there were 1,897 people, 829 households, and 509 families residing in the city. The population density was 813.7 people per square mile (314.4/km2). There were 987 housing units at an average density of 423.4 per square mile (163.6/km2). The racial makeup of the city was 93.09% White, 0.26% African American, 2.21% Native American, 0.90% Asian, 0.05% Pacific Islander, 1.16% from other races, and 2.32% from two or more races. Hispanic or Latino of any race were 2.69% of the population.

There were 829 households, out of which 24.4% had children under the age of 18 living with them, 48.7% were married couples living together, 10.3% had a female householder with no husband present, and 38.5% were non-families. 33.2% of all households were made up of individuals, and 14.7% had someone living alone who was 65 years of age or older. The average household size was 2.19 and the average family size was 2.75.

In the city, the population was spread out, with 21.0% under the age of 18, 6.2% from 18 to 24, 23.4% from 25 to 44, 30.5% from 45 to 64, and 19.0% who were 65 years of age or older. The median age was 45 years. For every 100 females, there were 92.4 males. For every 100 females age 18 and over, there were 91.2 males.

The median income for a household in the city was $30,243, and the median income for a family was $37,634. Males had a median income of $31,083 versus $23,512 for females. The per capita income for the city was $16,717. About 8.8% of families and 12.4% of the population were below the poverty line, including 12.8% of those under age 18 and 6.9% of those age 65 or over.

Education
Gold Beach is served by the Central Curry School District. The schools, Riley Creek School and Gold Beach High School, are located in Gold Beach.

The entire county is in the Southwestern Oregon Community College district.

Notable people 

 Gregory Harrison — actor; was a resident of Gold Beach for 15 years.
 Travis Rush — country singer; grew up in Gold Beach.
 Bridgette Wilson — actress, Miss Oregon Teen USA 1990, Miss Teen USA 1990, wife of tennis champion Pete Sampras; was born and raised in Gold Beach.

Transportation
 Gold Beach Municipal Airport

Media

Newspapers
The Curry County Reporter is the region's newspaper, established in 1914.

Radio
  KGBR 92.7 FM - Classic Hits

See also
 Steamboats of the Oregon Coast

References

External links

  City of Gold Beach Official Site
 Entry for Gold Beach in the Oregon Blue Book
 Gold Beach Chamber of Commerce

 
Cities in Curry County, Oregon
County seats in Oregon
Populated coastal places in Oregon
Port cities in Oregon
Oregon Coast
Rogue River (Oregon)
1863 establishments in Oregon
Populated places established in 1863
Cities in Oregon
Curry County, Oregon